Burgess v. United States, 553 U.S. 124 (2008), was a United States Supreme Court case concerning the interpretation of the words "federal drug offense" in the Controlled Substances Act.

Background
Keith Lavon Burgess was convicted in a South Carolina state court for cocaine possession. Although the maximum sentence under state law was two years, South Carolina classified the offense as a misdemeanor, rather than a felony. At a later proceeding, Burgess pleaded guilty for conspiracy to possess with intent to distribute 50 grams or more of cocaine in Federal Court. At his sentencing, the judge applied to Burgess the "prior conviction" statute, which required a minimum twenty-year sentence for anyone with a prior "felony drug conviction." In Burgess' appeal to the Court he maintained that since South Carolina considered his first offense a misdemeanor, the "prior felony drug conviction" did not apply.

Opinion of the Court
In a unanimous opinion written by Justice Ruth Bader Ginsburg, the Supreme Court rejected Burgess' appeal, holding that "felony" refers to any offense that is punishable for more than a year even if another jurisdiction classifies the offense as a misdemeanor.

See also
 Lopez v. Gonzales: state felony conviction that would be a federal misdemeanor
 List of United States Supreme Court cases
 Lists of United States Supreme Court cases by volume
 List of United States Supreme Court cases by the Roberts Court

References

External links 

United States Supreme Court cases of the Roberts Court
United States Supreme Court cases
2008 in United States case law
United States controlled substances case law